Martin Pecina (born 9 July 1968) is a Czech politician, who twice served as the minister of Interior of the Czech Republic. He was the minister of Interior in caretaker governments of Jan Fischer and Jiří Rusnok. He also served as the chairman of the Office for the Protection of Competition.

Early life 
Pecina was born in Ostrava. He's a graduate of the Technical University of Ostrava. He worked as a programmer and was Deputy Minister of Industry and Trade from 2003 to 2005 with the Social Democratic Party. Since 2 September 2005, Pecina has been chairman of the Office for the Protection of Competition.

Ministerial post 
In May 2009, Pecina became Minister of Interior in the cabinet of the Prime Minister Jan Fischer. He was nominated by the Social Democratic Party.

References 

1968 births
Living people
Interior ministers of the Czech Republic
Czech Social Democratic Party Government ministers
People from Český Těšín